Paterra is an Italian surname. Notable people with the surname include:

Greg Paterra (born 1967), American football player
Herb Paterra (born 1940), American football player and coach

Italian-language surnames